Carpathian Biosphere Reserve is a biosphere reserve that was established as a nature reserve in 1968 and became part of the World Network of Biosphere Reserves of UNESCO in 1992. Since 2007 bigger portion of the reserve along with some territories of the Uzh River National Park was listed with the UNESCO World Heritage Sites as part of the Ancient and Primeval Beech Forests of the Carpathians and Other Regions of Europe.

The greatest part of the reserve is covered by virgin forests. Administratively, the biosphere reserve is located in four districts of Zakarpattia Oblast, Ukraine. 

It is adjacent to the Carpathian National Nature Park.

Territory division
The territory of Carpathian Biosphere Reserve is divided into several functional zones: core (A) and buffer zones (B), zone of the regulated protected regime (D) and anthropogenic landscapes (C). They differ one from another by the nature use regimes. Such division helps to achieve the most appropriate balance between nature protection needs and the requirements of local people.

Composition

The biosphere reserve consists of six separate preservation massifs as well as two botanical reserves (zakazniks).
 Chornohora preservation massif
 Svydovets preservation massif
 Marmorosh preservation massif
 Kuziy preservation massif
 Uholka and Shyroka Luzhanka preservation massif
 Preservation massif "Dolyna Nartsysiv" (Narcissus Valley)
 Botanical zakaznik "Chorna Hora" (Black Mountain)
 Botanical zakaznik "Yulivska Hora" (Julius Mountain)

Chornohora preservation massif is located on the southern macroslope of the Chornohora, the highest mountain belt in the Eastern Beskids and the Ukrainian Carpathians.

Kuziy preservation massif is located on the southern branches of the Svydovets mountain range at an elevation of 350–1409 m.a.s.l. with total area of 4925 ha. Its territory is completely located in the forest area.

Uholka and Shyroka Luzhanka preservation massif is located on the southern slopes of the Krasna and the Menchil mountains grasslands at an elevation of 400 – 1280 m.a.s.l. The total area of the protected territory is 15580 ha.

Preservation massif "Narcissus Valley" is located at an elevation of 180–200 m.a.s.l. in the western part of Khustsko-Solotvynska Valley and lies in a flatland of the Khustets river flood plain.

The “Chorna hora" botanical zakaznik occupies a territory of 823 ha in the Volcanic Carpathians, on the Chornahora mountain, which is a part of the Hutynskiy range. It was established to preserve oak, hornbeam-oak, oak-beech and beech-oak forests in 1974 and became a part of the Carpathians biosphere reserve in 1997.

The "Yulivska Hora" botanical zakaznik covers an area of 176 ha on the slopes of the Yulivski mountains island massif in the Vyhorlat-Hutynskiy volcanic ridge. It was established in 1974 and became a part of the Carpathian biosphere reserve in 1997. It aimed to preserve the oak-groves formed by many heat-loving Balkan and Mediterranean species. It is characterized by the warmest climate in the whole Ukrainian Carpathians.

Flora and fauna
The flora of CBR consists of 262 fungi species, 392 species of lichens, 440 species of mosses and 1062 species of vascular plants. The algal flora includes 465 species. 64 of plants species represented in this reserve are listed in the Ukrainian Red Data Book as well as in IUCN and the European Red Lists. The fauna of the Carpathian biosphere reserve is represented by 64 mammal species, 173 birds, 9 reptiles, 13 amphibians, 23 fish and more than 10,000 invertebrate species. 72 of these species are listed in the Ukrainian Red Data Book and in IUCN and the European Red Lists.

References

External links

 Carpathian Biosphere Reserve official website
 Detailed information on areas of the reserve

Biosphere reserves of Ukraine
Geography of Zakarpattia Oblast
Carpathians
Zakarpattia Oblast outdoor recreation
Old-growth forests
Protected areas established in 1968
Protected areas of Zakarpattia Oblast
World Heritage Sites in Ukraine
Protected areas of the Eastern Carpathians
1968 establishments in the Soviet Union